Saket Nagar is a suburb of Bhopal, India, on the southern side of the city. It is part of Ward 54 of Bhopal Municipal Corporation.

Etymology
In Sanskrit, Saket is the ancient name of the city of Ayodhya, an important Hindu religious place, said to be the place of residence for Lord Rama. Saket is also the name of a famous epic Hindi poetic work of Maithili Sharan Gupt, an account of the Ramayana through the eyes of Urmila.

Population
Saket Nagar is mostly inhabited by retired employees of public sector company BHEL like its adjacent localities Shakti nagar and Alkapuri.

Education
Saket Nagar has two major schools nearby namely the Bhopal Public School and Sagar Public School.

Health
The All India Institute of Medical Sciences has a medical research public university located in the Saket Nagar suburb. It is one of the seven AIIMS  established by the Ministry of Health and Family Welfare under the Pradhan Mantri Swasthya Suraksha Yojna (PMSSY).

References

External links
Top Institute Near Saket Nagar
Advanced Materials and Processes Research Institute
All India Institute of Medical Sciences (AIIMS) Bhopal
Antops Technologies IT Development and Training Institute

Neighbourhoods in Bhopal